Khersones can refer to:

Chersonesos, archeological site in Crimea
Khersones (ship), tall ship from Ukraine
, a Russian coastal tanker